Gordon Torr (born 17 October 1953) is a former Global Creative Director of JWT, and author of Managing Creative People: Lessons for Leadership in the Ideas Economy (2008), published by John Wiley & Sons. His second novel, Kill Yourself and Count to 10, about his time at Greefswald, the hard labour camp created by convicted sex offender Aubrey Levin, was published in May 2014.

Biography

Educated in Natal, South Africa, Torr covered the 1976 Soweto Riots as a journalist for the SABC, taught at St Joseph’s Minor Seminary in Lesotho, and was employed as a copywriter by Grey Advertising & Marketing in 1980. Torr joined the Johannesburg office of JWT in 1985. He spent three years as Creative Director of JWT Mexico, based in Mexico City, before transferring to London as Global Creative Director of De Beers and, subsequently, of Diageo, Kellogg’s and Vodafone. He was appointed Chair of the Worldwide Creative Council of JWT in 2003.

Torr lives in the UK with his family and is currently writing several books.

Books

Non fiction
 2008: Managing Creative People: Lessons for Leadership in the Ideas Economy
2011: Managing Creative People: Lessons in Leadership for the Ideas Economy
2019: Skip ad in 5 The AD Blockers guide to Brand planning

Novels
 2010: The Turing Test (under the nom de plume of Leyland Torr)
 2014: Kill Yourself and Count to 10, Penguin South Africa

References

External links
 
 Penguin Website

Living people
1953 births
Copywriters
South African writers
South African businesspeople
South African journalists